The Mashonaland A cricket team was a first-class cricket team representing the Mashonaland province in Zimbabwe. They competed in the Logan Cup from 1997 to 2002, though they did not compete in the 1999–2000 competition. The club played their home matches at the Alexandra Sports Club.

First-class record

References 

Former senior cricket clubs in Zimbabwe
Former Zimbabwean first-class cricket teams
History of Zimbabwean cricket
Cricket teams in Zimbabwe